Marcel Łoziński (born 17 May 1940) is a Polish film director and screenwriter. He has directed 22 films since 1972. He was nominated for an Academy Award for Best Documentary Short for 89mm from Europe. He was born in Paris, France.

Selected filmography
 89mm from Europe (1993)
 Wszystko moze sie przytrafic [Anything Can Happen] (1995)
 Żeby nie bolało [So It Doesn't Hurt] (1998)
 Pamiętam [I Remember] (2001). Grand Prix, at the 2003 Warsaw Jewish Film Festival
 Tonia i jej dzieci Best polish film award at the 2013 Jewish Motifs International Film Festival
 Father and Son on a Journey (2013)

References

External links
 
 Profile on Culture.pl
 Marcel Łoziński in the context of Polish documentary filmmakers in the 1990s

1940 births
Living people
Polish film directors
Polish screenwriters